This is a list of works classified as biopunk, a subgenre of science fiction and derivative of the cyberpunk movement. Some works may only be centered around biotechnologies and not fit a more constrained definition of biopunk which may include additional cyberpunk or postcyberpunk elements.

Print media

Novels

The Butterfly Effect by Rajat Chaudhuri
 Blood Music (1985) by Greg Bear
 Change Agent (novel) (2017) by Daniel Suarez − described as doing for biopunk what William Gibson did for cyberpunk
 Clade (2003) and Crache (2004) by Mark Budz
 Darwin series (1999–2003) by Greg Bear
  Got a Bad Case of the Horribly Wrongs (2016) by Khurt Khave 
 Holy Fire (1996) by Bruce Sterling
 Leviathan Trilogy (2009–11) by Scott Westerfeld
 The Xenogenesis trilogy (1987–89) by Octavia E. Butler
 The Movement of Mountains (1987) by Michael Blumlein	
 Ribofunk (1996) by Paul Di Filippo
 Rifter series (1999–2004) by Peter Watts
 Schismatrix (1985) by Bruce Sterling
 Sleepless series (1991–99) by Nancy Kress
The Sky Lords trilogy by John Brosnan.
Unwind (2007) by Neal Shusterman
 Wetware (1988) by Rudy Rucker
 White Devils (2004) by Paul J. McAuley
 The Windup Girl (2009) by Paolo Bacigalupi − on Time's list "The Top 10 Everything of 2009"
 Winterlong (1990) by Elizabeth Hand
 Twig (web novel) (2015–17) by John C. McCrae

Short stories
 "The Brains of Rats" (1988) by Michael Blumlein
 The People of Sand and Slag (2004) by Paolo Bacigalupi
 "Gene Wars" (1991) by Paul J. McAuley

Graphic novels and comics 

 Blame! (1998) by Tsutomu Nihei
 Doktor Sleepless (2007—present) by Warren Ellis
 Fluorescent Black (2008–2010) by M.F. Wilson and Nathan Fox

Film and television

Feature films
 Blade Runner (1982)
 Super Mario Bros. (1993)
 Gattaca (1997)
 eXistenZ (1999)
 Resident Evil series (2002–2016; 2021)
 Code 46 (2003)
 Splice (2009)
 Repo Men (2010)
 Antiviral (2012)
 Prometheus (2012)

Short films
 LOOM (2012) by Jake Scott
 STEM (TBA) by Julien Planté

Television series

 Dark Angel (2000–2002)
ReGenesis (2004–2008)
 Orphan Black (2013–2017)
 Orphan Black – 7 Genes (2017–present)
 Kamen Rider Amazons (2016–2017)

Video games

The Ooze (1995) developed by Sega Technical Institute where a scientist gets turned into a blob-like creature by a chemicals corporation seeking to unleash on the world a bioweapon in the form of a virus that only them possesses the cure for.
 Terranigma (Tenchi Sōzō) (1995) and Final Fantasy VII (1997) are Japanese RPGs which feature some biopunk elements: the mad scientist Beruga in Terranigma and the Shinra Corporation in Final Fantasy VII are trying to control the world via biotechnology and genetic manipulations.
 Panzer Dragoon series  (1995-2002) developed by Team Andromeda/Smilebit and published by Sega
 Resident Evil series (1996–present) developed and published by Capcom
 Parasite Eve (1998) developed by Square and published by Square Electronic Arts
 Parasite Eve II (2000) developed by Square and published by Square Electronic Arts
 SiN series (1998–2006) developed by Ritual Entertainment (except for the expansion pack Wages of Sin that was developed by 2015, Inc.) and published by Activision, features cyberpunk and biopunk elements.
 Evolva (2000) developed by Computer Artworks Ltd. and published by Interplay Entertainment
 Dark Angel (2001) developed by Radical Entertainment for the TV series of the same name
 Quake 4 (2005) developed by Raven Software and published by Activision
 Rogue Trooper (2006) developed by Rebellion Developments and published by Eidos Interactive
 Prey (2006) developed by Human Head Studios and published by 2K Games
 BioShock series (2007–present) developed by Irrational Games and published by 2K Games
 Fracture (2008) developed by Day 1 Studios and published by LucasArts
 Prototype (2009) developed by Radical Entertainment and published by Activision
 Killing Floor series (2009–present) developed and published by Tripwire Interactive
 Crysis 2 (2011) developed by Crytek and published by Electronic Arts
 The Deus Ex franchise (2000-2016), developed by Ion Storm and Eidos Montreal and published by Eidos Interactive and Square Enix Eu 
 Wrought Flesh (2021), developed by Narayan Walters
 Cruelty Squad (2021), developed and published by Consumer Softproducts
 Scorn (2022), developed and published by Ebb Software
 Athanasy (2022), a visual novel, developed by Wirion and published by 7DOTS, based on real study.

See also
 List of cyberpunk works
 Cyberpunk derivatives
 Genetic engineering in science fiction

References

Biopunk Works
Biocybernetics
Bioinformatics